Omar Ghattas is the John A. and Katherine G. Jackson Chair in Computational Geosciences and Professor of Mechanical Engineering and Geological Sciences at the University of Texas at Austin.

Early life and career
Ghattas obtained a Ph.D. in computational mechanics from Duke University.  He is the director of the Center for Computational Geosciences and Optimization at the Institute for Computational Engineering and Sciences.

Ghattas was twice awarded a Gordon Bell Prize that "recognizes outstanding achievement in high-performance computing applications". In 2019, Ghattas was awarded the SIAM Geosciences Career Prize for “groundbreaking contributions in analysis, methods, algorithms, and software for grand challenge computational problems in geosciences, and for exceptional influence as mentor, educator, and collaborator.”

Awards
Fellow of the Society for Industrial and Applied Mathematics (2014)

References

External links
Website at UT Austin

1962 births
Living people
Duke University alumni
Carnegie Mellon University faculty
University of Texas at Austin faculty
Fellows of the Society for Industrial and Applied Mathematics